Nemichthys larseni is an eel in the family Nemichthyidae (snipe eels). It was described by Jørgen G. Nielsen and David G. Smith in 1978. It is a marine, deep water-dwelling eel which is known from the eastern Pacific Ocean, including Oregon and Hawaii, USA, Mexico, and the Gulf of California.

Etymology
The species epithet "larseni" was given in honour of Verner Larsen, credited with starting the study of the species at the University of Copenhagen.

References

larseni
Taxa named by Jørgen G. Nielsen
Taxa named by David G. Smith
Fish described in 1978